Yeaman is a surname. Notable people with the surname include: 

 Barbara Yeaman (born 1924), American conservationist
 George Helm Yeaman (1829–1908), American Representative from Kentucky
 James Yeaman (1816–1886), Scottish Liberal Party politician
 Kirk Yeaman (born 1983), English rugby player

See also
Yeaman (hill), a categorisation of British hills

See also
Yeamans